Cadenas de amargura (English title: Chains of bitterness) is a Mexican telenovela produced by Carlos Sotomayor for Televisa in 1991. The story revolves around Cecilia, who at eight-years-old loses both of her parents and is then taken care of by her two paternal aunts, Natalia and Evangelina. As the years pass. Evangelina makes her niece’s life miserable, she is bitter, overbearing, and dismissive of her feelings just as she is to Natalia, whom she holds much power over. Cecilia is desperate to both find the reason as to why her aunt Evangelina is so cold towards her and to find a way to escape from her prison as her desire to be free only increases as she falls in love with a man her aunt disapproves of.

The series stars Diana Bracho, Daniela Castro, Delia Casanova, Raymundo Capetillo, Tina Romero, Cynthia Klitbo, Hilda Aguirre and Raúl Araiza.

Plot 
After her parents are killed in an accident, little Cecilia must go live with her aunts, Evangelina and Natalia, both single and very different. Cecilia loves Natalia like a mother, while Evangelina brings her fear. Evangelina is always looking to break the young girl's optimism and resents the young girl.

After a time, Cecilia grows up and is on the brink of turning 18. Her neighbor, Sofia, has become her best friend. Sofia wishes to be like any other girl and have Cecilia as her best friend, but Evangelina always tries to prevent Cecilia from having fun. Meanwhile, Natalia notices Evangelina's mistreatment, but does nothing but watch as Cecilia suffers because she also fears the strong character of Evangelina.

Meanwhile, Sofia has her own issues as she has an estranged father. He abandoned her and her mother for another woman, which causes disdain from Evangelina who disapproves of her neighbors. Both Cecilia and Sofia find love throughout the story.

Sofia falls for a good, noble man named Gerardo, who has just finished his studies and now works in a candy store. He had the option to work in his father's ceramic factory but declines the offer. Meanwhile, Cecilia meets Joaquin, a young accountant, who happens to be Gerardo's friend and co-worker. Joaquin falls for Cecilia who doesn't reciprocate his feelings, but still they become a couple.

Furthermore, she starts to think about her future and which university she should go to with the money her parents left her. Evangelina discovers the secret courtship between Cecilia and Joaquin and begins to devise a plan to end the relationship. Joaquin, not knowing what he's up against, asks for Cecilia's hand in marriage; but Evangelina poisons him, ending any happiness between Cecilia and him.

Cecilia begins to think she will never leave her aunt's home and considers herself a prisoner. She decides to continue her university plans but Evangelina will not tolerate her having a bright future and tells her, her father left no inheritance for her. She begins searching for clues and soon discovers her real heritage.

Evangelina tries to murder her by pushing her down the stairs, but she ends up badly injured instead. Fighting for her life, she is visited by a local parish named Father Julio. Another part of the story is Gerardo and Cecilia slowly fall in love and have to confess their secret to Sofia, while trying not to hurt her as they both care for Sofia.

Julio is a pivotal point as he was Natalia's lover before Evangelina separated them out of jealousy. She made Julio believe Natalia had married another man, while telling Natalia she'd received news via an anonymous telegram that Julio had died.

Julio is actually alive; he is devastated by the news of Natalia being married so he decides to become a priest. Natalia soon discovers she is pregnant; and, with Evangelina's advice, gives the child to her brother and his wife. The child given away turns out to be Cecilia.

The presence of Julio becomes the main trigger to break Evangelina's bitterness and hatred, who after murdering Natalia, is out to ruin Cecilia. Cecilia is unaware of this and just wants a happy life with Gerardo at her side.

Cast

Main 

 Diana Bracho as Evangelina Vizcaíno Lara
 Daniela Castro as Cecilia Vizcaíno Robles
 Delia Casanova as Natalia Vizcaíno Lara
 Raymundo Capetillo as Renato Garza
 Tina Romero as Martha Fernández
 Cynthia Klitbo as Sofía Gastelum Fernández
 Hilda Aguirre as Elena Osuna de Garza
 Raúl Araiza as Gerardo Garza Osuna

Supporting 

 Alexis Ayala as Víctor Medina Blanco
 Luis Cárdenas as Salvador de la Peña
 Bolivar Hack as Roberto Vizcaíno Lara
 Raúl Magaña as Joaquín de la Peña Barraza
 Aurora Molina as Jovita
 Roberto Montiel as Felipe Andrade
 Marcela Páez as Sister Angélica Sepúlveda
 Raquel Pankowsky as Inés Blancarte
 Ivette Proal as Elsa Robles de Vizcaíno
 Gilberto Román as Manuel Alejo
 Cecilia Romo as Mother Superior
 Miguel Córcega as Father José María
 Fernando Luján as Father Julio
 Karen Beatriz as Cecilia Vizcaíno Robles (Child)
 Priscila Reyes as Sofía Gastelum Fernández (Child)

Awards and nominations

References

External links 

1991 telenovelas
Mexican telenovelas
1991 Mexican television series debuts
1991 Mexican television series endings
Spanish-language telenovelas
Television shows set in Mexico
Televisa telenovelas